Upper Lyde is a small village in Herefordshire, England, around  north of Hereford city centre. It forms part of the Pipe and Lyde civil parish.

Ruins of a timber castle can be found near the village  The village can be easily accessed from the A49 road.

References

Villages in Herefordshire